Elections in Missouri are held to fill various local, state and federal seats. Special elections may be held to fill vacancies at other points in time. 

In a 2020 study, Missouri was ranked as the 3rd hardest state for citizens to vote in.

Gubernatorial
 1820 Missouri gubernatorial election
 1824 Missouri gubernatorial election
 1825 Missouri gubernatorial special election
 1828 Missouri gubernatorial election
 1832 Missouri gubernatorial election
 1836 Missouri gubernatorial election
 1840 Missouri gubernatorial election
 1844 Missouri gubernatorial election
 1848 Missouri gubernatorial election
 1852 Missouri gubernatorial election
 1856 Missouri gubernatorial election
 1857 Missouri gubernatorial special election
 1860 Missouri gubernatorial election
 1864 Missouri gubernatorial election
 1868 Missouri gubernatorial election
 1870 Missouri gubernatorial election
 1872 Missouri gubernatorial election
 1874 Missouri gubernatorial election
 1876 Missouri gubernatorial election
 1880 Missouri gubernatorial election
 1884 Missouri gubernatorial election
 1888 Missouri gubernatorial election
 1892 Missouri gubernatorial election
 1896 Missouri gubernatorial election
 1900 Missouri gubernatorial election
 1904 Missouri gubernatorial election
 1908 Missouri gubernatorial election
 1912 Missouri gubernatorial election
 1916 Missouri gubernatorial election
 1920 Missouri gubernatorial election
 1924 Missouri gubernatorial election
 1928 Missouri gubernatorial election
 1932 Missouri gubernatorial election
 1936 Missouri gubernatorial election
 1940 Missouri gubernatorial election
 1944 Missouri gubernatorial election
 1948 Missouri gubernatorial election
 1952 Missouri gubernatorial election
 1956 Missouri gubernatorial election
 1960 Missouri gubernatorial election
 1964 Missouri gubernatorial election
 1968 Missouri gubernatorial election
 1972 Missouri gubernatorial election
 1976 Missouri gubernatorial election
 1980 Missouri gubernatorial election
 1984 Missouri gubernatorial election
 1988 Missouri gubernatorial election
 1992 Missouri gubernatorial election
 1996 Missouri gubernatorial election
 2000 Missouri gubernatorial election
 2004 Missouri gubernatorial election
 2008 Missouri gubernatorial election
 2012 Missouri gubernatorial election
 2016 Missouri gubernatorial election
 2020 Missouri gubernatorial election

Presidential

 1820 United States presidential election in Missouri
 1824 United States presidential election in Missouri
 1828 United States presidential election in Missouri
 1832 United States presidential election in Missouri
 1836 United States presidential election in Missouri
 1840 United States presidential election in Missouri
 1844 United States presidential election in Missouri
 1848 United States presidential election in Missouri
 1852 United States presidential election in Missouri
 1856 United States presidential election in Missouri
 1860 United States presidential election in Missouri
 1864 United States presidential election in Missouri
 1868 United States presidential election in Missouri
 1872 United States presidential election in Missouri
 1876 United States presidential election in Missouri
 1880 United States presidential election in Missouri
 1884 United States presidential election in Missouri
 1888 United States presidential election in Missouri
 1892 United States presidential election in Missouri
 1896 United States presidential election in Missouri
 1900 United States presidential election in Missouri
 1904 United States presidential election in Missouri
 1908 United States presidential election in Missouri
 1912 United States presidential election in Missouri
 1916 United States presidential election in Missouri
 1920 United States presidential election in Missouri
 1924 United States presidential election in Missouri
 1928 United States presidential election in Missouri
 1932 United States presidential election in Missouri
 1936 United States presidential election in Missouri
 1940 United States presidential election in Missouri
 1944 United States presidential election in Missouri
 1948 United States presidential election in Missouri
 1952 United States presidential election in Missouri
 1956 United States presidential election in Missouri
 1960 United States presidential election in Missouri
 1964 United States presidential election in Missouri
 1968 United States presidential election in Missouri
 1972 United States presidential election in Missouri
 1976 United States presidential election in Missouri
 1980 United States presidential election in Missouri
 1984 United States presidential election in Missouri
 1988 United States presidential election in Missouri
 1992 United States presidential election in Missouri
 1996 United States presidential election in Missouri
 2000 United States presidential election in Missouri
 2004 United States presidential election in Missouri
 2008 United States presidential election in Missouri
 2012 United States presidential election in Missouri
 2016 United States presidential election in Missouri
 2020 United States presidential election in Missouri

See also
Political party strength in Missouri
Women's suffrage in Missouri

References

External links
Elections at the Missouri Secretary of State official website

 
 
  (State affiliate of the U.S. League of Women Voters)
 

 
Political events in Missouri